The tanpura, also referred to as tambura and tanpuri, is a long-necked plucked string instrument, originating in  India, found in various forms in Indian music.

It does not play melody, but rather supports and sustains the melody of another instrument or singer by providing a continuous harmonic bourdon or drone. A tanpura is not played in rhythm with the soloist or percussionist: as the precise timing of plucking a cycle of four strings in a continuous loop is a determinant factor in the resultant sound, it is played unchangingly during the complete performance. The repeated cycle of plucking all strings creates the sonic canvas on which the melody of the raga is drawn. The combined sound of all strings–each string a fundamental tone with its own spectrum of overtones–supports and blends with the external tones sung or played by the soloist.

Hindustani musicians favour the term tanpura whereas Carnatic musicians say tambura; tanpuri is a smaller variant sometimes used for accompanying instrumental soloists.

History
Tanpuras form the root of the ensemble and indeed of the music itself, as the tanpura creates an acoustic dynamic reference chord from which the ragas (melodic modes) derive their distinctive character, color, and flavour. Stephen Slawek notes that by the end of the 16th century, the tanpura had "fully developed in its modern form", and was seen in the miniature paintings of the Mughals. Slawek further suggests that due to structural similarity the sitar and tanpura share a related history.

An electronic tanpura, a small box that imitates the sound of a tanpura, is sometimes used in contemporary Indian classical music performances instead of a tanpura, though this practice is controversial.

Tanpura makers
The Sitarmaker family of Miraj is regarded as the finest producers of tanpuras in the world. The family has been making tanpuras for over seven generations from 1850.

Construction 
The body shape of the tanpura somewhat resembles that of the sitar, but it has no frets – as the strings are always plucked at their full lengths. One or more tanpuras may be used to accompany vocalists or instrumentalists. It has four or five (rarely six) metal strings, which are plucked one after another in a regular pattern to create a harmonic resonance on the basic notes of a key.

Bridge and strings
The overtone-rich sound and the audible movement in the inner resonances of tone is achieved by applying the principle of jivari which creates a sustained "buzzing" sound in which particular harmonics will resonate with focused clarity. To achieve this effect, the strings pass over a table-shaped, curved-top bridge, the front of which slopes gently away from the surface of the strings. When a string is plucked, it has an intermittent periodical grazing contact with the bridge. When the string moves up and down, the downward wave will touch a far point on the curve of the bridge, and as the energy of motion of the string gradually diminishes, these points of contact of the string on the bridge will gradually shift as well, being a compound function of amplitude, the curvature of the bridge, pitch, string tension and time. When the string is plucked, it has a large amplitude. As the energy of the string's movement gradually diminishes, the contact point of the string with the bridge slowly creeps up the slope of the bridge. Depending on scale, tension and pitch, this can take between three and ten seconds.

This dynamic process can be fine-tuned using a cotton thread between string and bridge: by shifting the thread, the grazing contact sequence is shifted to a different position on the bridge, changing the harmonic content. Every single string produces its own cascading range of harmonics and, at the same time, builds up a particular resonance. According to this principle, tanpuras are attentively tuned to achieve a particular tonal shade relative to the tonal characteristics of the raga. These more delicate aspects of tuning are directly related to what Indian musicians call raga svaroop, which is about how characteristic intonations are important defining aspects of a particular raga. The tanpura's particular setup, with the cotton thread as a variable focus-point, made it possible to explore a multitude of harmonic relations produced by the subtle harmonic interplay in time of its four strings.

Sizes and tunings
Tanpuras come in different sizes and pitches: larger "males", smaller "females" for vocalists, and a yet smaller version is used for accompanying sitar or sarod, called tanpuri. These play at the octave so as not to drown out the soloist's lower registers. Male vocalists use the biggest instruments and pitch their tonic note (Sa), often at D, C or lower, some go down to B-flat; female singers usually a fifth higher, though these tonic notes may vary according to the preference of the singer, as there is no absolute and fixed pitch-reference in the Indian Classical music systems. One female singer may take her 'sa' at F, another at A, sitaras tune mostly around C, sarodiyas around C, sarangiyas vary more between D and F, and bansuriyas mostly play from E. The male tanpura has an open string length of approximately one metre; the female is three-fourths of the male. The standard tuning is 5-8-8-1 (so do′ do′ do) or, in Indian sargam, Pa-sa-sa-Sa. For ragas that omit the fifth tone, pa, the first string is tuned down to the natural fourth: 4-8-8-1 or Ma-sa-sa-Sa. Some ragas that omit Pa and shuddha Ma, such as Marwa or Hindol, require a less common tuning with shuddha Dha (major 6th), DHA-sa-sa-SA or 6-8-8-1, or with the 7th, NI-s-s-S. With a five-string instrument, the seventh or NI (major or minor 7th) can be added: PA-NI-sa-sa-SA (5-7-8-8-1)or MA-NI-sa-sa-SA (4-7-8-8-1). Both minor and major 7th harmonics are clearly distinguishable in the harmonic texture of the overall sound, so when the Ni - strings are tuned into these harmonics, the resultant sound will be perfectly harmonious. Usually the octave strings are in steel wire, and the tonic, 4th or 5th strings in brass or bronze wire. If a string will be tuned to the 6th or 7th, a steel string is advised instead.

Variants 
Tanpuras are designed in two different styles:
Miraj style: the favourite form of tanpura for Hindustani performers. It is usually between three and five feet in length, with a carved, rounded resonator plate (tabli) and a long, hollow straight neck, in section resembling a rounded capital D. The round lower chamber to which the tabli, the connecting heel-piece and the neck (dandh) are fixed is cut from a selected and dried gourd (tumba). Wood used is either tun or teak; bridges are usually cut from one piece of bone.
Tanjore style: this is a south Indian style of tambura, used widely by Carnatic performers. It has a somewhat different shape and style of decoration from that of the miraj, but is otherwise much the same size. Typically, no gourd is used, but the spherical part is gouged out of a solid block of wood. The neck is somewhat smaller in diameter. Jackwood is used throughout; bridges are usually cut from one piece of rosewood. Often, two rosettes are drilled out and ornamented with inlay work.

References

Sources
 source for Sangit Parijat is Ahobal Pandit, translated by Kalind-Hatvas, Sangeet Karyalaya 1971
 Wim van der Meer - Joep Bor: De roep van de Kokila, historische en hedendaagse aspekten van de Indiase muziek; Martinus Nijhoff / 's-Gravenhage 1982, 
 Hindustani Music, 13th to 20th centuries, editors: Joep Bor, Françoise Delvoye, Jane Harvey & Emmy te Nijenhuis; Codarts, Manohar 2010
 
 On some Indian string instruments (1921) Sir C V Raman, FRS, M.A., D.Sc. (Hon), Palit Professor of Physics at the University of Calcutta, Nobel Prize, 1930
 Beyond Swayambhu Gandhar: an analysis of perceived tanpura notes. Paritosh K. Pandya. Tata Institute of Fundamental Research, Mumbai 
  Audio samples of tanpura of various pitch, Glorian.bandcamp.com

Further reading
Some reflections on the use of Electronic Tanpura and the intricacies of tanpura tuning. Medieval.org, Martin Spaink, 2003.

Indian musical instruments
Hindustani musical instruments
Carnatic music instruments
Necked bowl lutes
Tanbur